Robert Allan Cruickshank (16 November 1894 – 27 August 1975) was a prominent professional golfer from Scotland. He competed in the PGA of America circuit in the 1920s and 1930s, the forerunner of the PGA Tour.

Early life
Born in Grantown-on-Spey in rural northern Scotland, Cruickshank learned his golf as a boy playing over the town's course. As a teenager he also worked there as a caddie.

In that era, country houses around Grantown-on-Spey were often rented to rich Edinburgh families for the summer. A wealthy widow named Mrs. Isabella Usher made an offer to Cruickshank's parents to provide an education for their two sons in Edinburgh. In the autumn of 1909, Cruickshank and his younger brother John moved south. Mrs. Usher became their legal guardian and they lived at her house in the city's Murrayfield district. They were educated at the nearby Daniel Stewart's College.

Although Cruickshank was not tall (5 ft 5in), he was a fine athlete, and in 1912 the year that he left school, he ran the 100 yards in a time of 10.4 seconds. This time wasn't beaten until 1960 by the future Scotland international rugby player Sandy Hinshelwood.

He was also becoming an outstanding golfer and met and became friends with another rising local golfer, Tommy Armour. Armour and Cruikshank played together regularly over the Braid Hills course. Bobby also became a member of Turnhouse Golf Club on the west of the city.

Cruickshank served in the British Army in World War I. Captured in action by the Germans, he was a prisoner of war and later successfully escaped.

On returning from the war, Cruickshank won what was then Edinburgh's top amateur competition (the Edinburgh Coronation Cup) in both 1919 and 1920. The tournament was played at Braid Hills course which is still the city's premier municipal course. Representing his old school's former pupils (Stewart's FP Golf Club) Cruickshank was part of a team which won the Evening Dispatch Trophy. He also reached the final rounds of the British Amateur Championship played at Muirfield in the summer of 1920.

These successes encouraged Cruickshank to consider turning professional and moved to the United States with his wife Helen.

Professional career
Cruickshank turned professional in 1921 and moved to the United States, as suggested by his mentor and friend, Tommy Armour. He rose to prominence in the U.S. after reaching the last four of the PGA Championship in both 1922 and 1923. He lost both times to eventual champion Gene Sarazen. Cruickshank was also twice runner-up in the U.S. Open. In 1923, he finished second to Bobby Jones down by two shots after an 18 hole playoff at Inwood Country Club, New York. In 1932, he was beaten by Gene Sarazen at Fresh Meadow Country Club, New York.

Cruickshank came home to Scotland to play at Muirfield in the 1929 Open Championship. Despite only bringing two clubs with him and borrowing the rest from the Gullane professional, he finished sixth. In a nod to his old school, Cruickshank wore his Stewart's College tie while playing in the second round of the championship. He won £10 for sixth place while that years "Champion Golfer", Walter Hagen, won £75.

Cruickshank won 17 tour events in his career and his greatest year was 1927, when he won the Los Angeles and Texas Opens and finished as the leading money winner for the year. His last victory on tour was in 1936 and he had 16 top-10 finishes in major championships.

Cruickshank was a club pro in Richmond, Virginia, in 1930s and 1940s, and later in Pittsburgh, Pennsylvania. He was also a winter pro in Florida.

Personal life 
Cruickshank died after a brief illness at age 80 in Delray Beach, Florida. His wife Nellie (1895–1965) died ten years earlier in Pittsburgh.

Professional wins (29)

PGA Tour wins (17)
 1921 (2) St. Joseph Open (as an amateur), New York State Open
 1924 (1) Colorado Open
 1926 (2) North and South Open, Mid-South Pro-Am Bestball
 1927 (5) Los Angeles Open, Texas Open, South Central Open, North and South Open, Westchester Open
 1928 (1) Maryland Open
 1929 (1) Westchester Open
 1934 (3) National Capital Open, British Colonial Open, Pinehurst Fall Pro-Pro (with Tommy Armour)
 1935 (1) Orlando Open
 1936 (1) Virginia Open

Other wins (12)
this list may be incomplete
 1925 Miami International Four-Ball (with Johnny Farrell)
 1927 Miami International Four-Ball (with Tommy Armour)
 1933 Virginia Open
 1934 Virginia Open
 1935 Virginia Open
 1937 Virginia Open
 1938 Mid South Pro/Pro (with Tommy Armour; tie with Henry Picard and Jack Grout)
 1939 Virginia Open
 1943 North and South Open
 1945 Middle Atlantic PGA Championship
 1949 Tri-State PGA Championship
 1950 Tri-State PGA Championship

Results in major championships

NYF = tournament not yet founded
NT = no tournament
WD = withdrew
CUT = missed the half-way cut
R64, R32, R16, QF, SF = round in which player lost in PGA Championship match play
"T" indicates a tie for a place

Source: British Amateur

See also
 List of golfers with most PGA Tour wins

References

External links
 
 PGA Museum of Golf: Hall of Fame – member profiles

Scottish male golfers
American male golfers
PGA Tour golfers
Golfers from Florida
British Army personnel of World War I
British World War I prisoners of war
World War I prisoners of war held by Germany
Scottish escapees
Escapees from German detention
Scottish emigrants to the United States
People educated at Stewart's Melville College
People from Badenoch and Strathspey
Sportspeople from Highland (council area)
People from Delray Beach, Florida
1894 births
1975 deaths